Mohamed Mazhar Abdel Rahman (born 11 November 1976) is an Egyptian former professional footballer who played for AS Monaco and the Egypt national football team

International goals

References

External links

1976 births
Living people
Egyptian footballers
Egypt international footballers
Egyptian expatriate footballers
Al Mokawloon Al Arab SC players
Al Masry SC players
AS Monaco FC players
LB Châteauroux players
Jiangsu F.C. players
Ligue 1 players
Expatriate footballers in France
Expatriate footballers in China
China League One players
Association football forwards